The men's 110 metres hurdles event at the 2003 Pan American Games was held on August 8–9.

Medalists

Results

Heats
Qualification: First 2 of each heat (Q) and the next 2 fastest (q) qualified for the final.

Wind:Heat 1: +0.9 m/s, Heat 2: +0.7 m/s, Heat 3: +1.8 m/s

Final
Wind: -0.2 m/s

References
Results

Athletics at the 2003 Pan American Games
2003